Specific impulse (usually abbreviated ) is a measure of how efficiently a reaction mass engine (a rocket using propellant or a jet engine using fuel) creates thrust. For engines whose reaction mass is only the fuel they carry, specific impulse is exactly proportional to the effective exhaust gas velocity.

A propulsion system with a higher specific impulse uses the mass of the propellant more efficiently. In the case of a rocket, this means less propellant needed for a given delta-v, so that the vehicle attached to the engine can more efficiently gain altitude and velocity.

In an atmospheric context, specific impulse can include the contribution to impulse provided by the mass of external air that is accelerated by the engine in some way, such as by an internal turbofan or heating by fuel combustion participation then thrust expansion or by external propeller. Jet engines breathe external air for both combustion and bypass, and therefore have a much higher specific impulse than rocket engines. The specific impulse in terms of propellant mass spent has units of distance per time, which is a notional velocity called the effective exhaust velocity. This is higher than the actual exhaust velocity because the mass of the combustion air is not being accounted for. Actual and effective exhaust velocity are the same in rocket engines operating in a vacuum.

General considerations
The amount of propellant can be measured either in units of mass or weight. If mass is used, specific impulse is an impulse per unit of mass, which dimensional analysis shows to have units of speed, specifically the effective exhaust velocity. As the SI system is mass-based, this type of analysis is usually done in meters per second. If a force-based unit system is used, impulse is divided by propellant weight (weight is a measure of force), resulting in units of time (seconds). These two formulations differ from each other by the standard gravitational acceleration (g0) at the surface of the earth.

The rate of change of momentum of a rocket (including its propellant) per unit time is equal to the thrust. The higher the specific impulse, the less propellant is needed to produce a given thrust for a given time and the more efficient the propellant is. This should not be confused with the physics concept of energy efficiency, which can decrease as specific impulse increases, since propulsion systems that give high specific impulse require high energy to do so.

Thrust and specific impulse should not be confused. Thrust is the force supplied by the engine and depends on the amount of reaction mass flowing through the engine. Specific impulse measures the impulse produced per unit of propellant and is proportional to the exhaust velocity. Thrust and specific impulse are related by the design and propellants of the engine in question, but this relationship is tenuous. For example, LH2/LO bipropellant produces higher  but lower thrust than RP-1/LO due to the exhaust gases having a lower density and higher velocity (H2O vs CO2 and H2O). In many cases, propulsion systems with very high specific impulse—some ion thrusters reach 10,000 seconds—produce low thrust. 

When calculating specific impulse, only propellant carried with the vehicle before use is counted. For a chemical rocket, the propellant mass therefore would include both fuel and oxidizer. In rocketry, a heavier engine with a higher specific impulse may not be as effective in gaining altitude, distance, or velocity as a lighter engine with a lower specific impulse, especially if the latter engine possesses a higher thrust-to-weight ratio. This is a significant reason for most rocket designs having multiple stages. The first stage is optimised for high thrust to boost the later stages with higher specific impulse into higher altitudes where they can perform more efficiently.

For air-breathing engines, only the mass of the fuel is counted, not the mass of air passing through the engine. Air resistance and the engine's inability to keep a high specific impulse at a fast burn rate are why all the propellant is not used as fast as possible.

If it were not for air resistance and the reduction of propellant during flight, specific impulse would be a direct measure of the engine's effectiveness in converting propellant weight or mass into forward momentum.

Units

The most common unit for specific impulse is the second, as values are identical regardless of whether the calculations are done in SI, imperial, or customary units. Nearly all manufacturers quote their engine performance in seconds, and the unit is also useful for specifying aircraft engine performance.

The use of metres per second to specify effective exhaust velocity is also reasonably common. The unit is intuitive when describing rocket engines, although the effective exhaust speed of the engines may be significantly different from the actual exhaust speed, especially in gas-generator cycle engines. For airbreathing jet engines, the effective exhaust velocity is not physically meaningful, although it can be used for comparison purposes.

Metres per second are numerically equivalent to newton-seconds per kg (N·s/kg), and SI measurements of specific impulse can be written in terms of either units interchangeably. This unit highlights the definition of specific impulse as impulse per unit mass of propellant.

Specific fuel consumption is inversely proportional to specific impulse and has units of g/(kN·s) or lb/(lbf·hr). Specific fuel consumption is used extensively for describing the performance of air-breathing jet engines.

Specific impulse in seconds

Specific impulse, measured in seconds, effectively means how many seconds this propellant, when paired with this engine, can accelerate its own initial mass at 1 g. The longer it can accelerate its own mass, the more delta-V it delivers to the whole system.

In other words, given a particular engine and a mass of a particular propellant, specific impulse measures for how long a time that engine can exert a continuous force (thrust) until fully burning that mass of propellant. A given mass of a more energy-dense propellant can burn for a longer duration than some less energy-dense propellant made to exert the same force while burning in an engine. Different engine designs burning the same propellant may not be equally efficient at directing their propellant's energy into effective thrust. 

For all vehicles, specific impulse (impulse per unit weight-on-Earth of propellant) in seconds can be defined by the following equation:

where:

 is the thrust obtained from the engine (newtons or pounds force),
 is the standard gravity, which is nominally the gravity at Earth's surface (m/s2 or ft/s2),
 is the specific impulse measured (seconds),
 is the mass flow rate of the expended propellant (kg/s or slugs/s)

The English unit pound mass is more commonly used than the slug, and when using pounds per second for mass flow rate, the conversion constant g0 becomes unnecessary, because the slug is dimensionally equivalent to pounds divided by g0:

Isp in seconds is the amount of time a rocket engine can generate thrust, given a quantity of propellant whose weight is equal to the engine's thrust. The last term on the right, is necessary for dimensional consistency

The advantage of this formulation is that it may be used for rockets, where all the reaction mass is carried on board, as well as airplanes, where most of the reaction mass is taken from the atmosphere. In addition, it gives a result that is independent of units used (provided the unit of time used is the second).

Rocketry
In rocketry, the only reaction mass is the propellant, so the specific impulse is calculated using an alternative method, giving results with units of seconds. Specific impulse is defined as the thrust integrated over time per unit weight-on-Earth of the propellant:

where

 is the specific impulse measured in seconds,
 is the average exhaust speed along the axis of the engine (in m/s or ft/s),
 is the standard gravity (in m/s2 or ft/s2).

In rockets, due to atmospheric effects, the specific impulse varies with altitude, reaching a maximum in a vacuum. This is because the exhaust velocity isn't simply a function of the chamber pressure, but is a function of the difference between the interior and exterior of the combustion chamber. Values are usually given for operation at sea level ("sl") or in a vacuum ("vac").

Specific impulse as effective exhaust velocity

Because of the geocentric factor of g0 in the equation for specific impulse, many prefer an alternative definition. The specific impulse of a rocket can be defined in terms of thrust per unit mass flow of propellant. This is an equally valid (and in some ways somewhat simpler) way of defining the effectiveness of a rocket propellant. For a rocket, the specific impulse defined in this way is simply the effective exhaust velocity relative to the rocket, ve. "In actual rocket nozzles, the exhaust velocity is not really uniform over the entire exit cross section and such velocity profiles are difficult to measure accurately. A uniform axial velocity, v e, is assumed for all calculations which employ one-dimensional problem descriptions. This effective exhaust velocity represents an average or mass equivalent velocity at which propellant is being ejected from the rocket vehicle." The two definitions of specific impulse are proportional to one another, and related to each other by:

where
 is the specific impulse in seconds,
 is the specific impulse measured in m/s, which is the same as the effective exhaust velocity measured in m/s (or ft/s if g is in ft/s2),
 is the standard gravity, 9.80665 m/s2 (in United States customary units 32.174 ft/s2).

This equation is also valid for air-breathing jet engines, but is rarely used in practice.

(Note that different symbols are sometimes used; for example, c is also sometimes seen for exhaust velocity. While the symbol  might logically be used for specific impulse in units of (N·s)/(m·kg); to avoid confusion, it is desirable to reserve this for specific impulse measured in seconds.)

It is related to the thrust, or forward force on the rocket by the equation:

where  is the propellant mass flow rate, which is the rate of decrease of the vehicle's mass.

A rocket must carry all its propellant with it, so the mass of the unburned propellant must be accelerated along with the rocket itself. Minimizing the mass of propellant required to achieve a given change in velocity is crucial to building effective rockets. The Tsiolkovsky rocket equation shows that for a rocket with a given empty mass and a given amount of propellant, the total change in velocity it can accomplish is proportional to the effective exhaust velocity. 

A spacecraft without propulsion follows an orbit determined by its trajectory and any gravitational field. Deviations from the corresponding velocity pattern (these are called Δv) are achieved by sending exhaust mass in the direction opposite to that of the desired velocity change.

Actual exhaust speed versus effective exhaust speed

When an engine is run within the atmosphere, the exhaust velocity is reduced by atmospheric pressure, in turn reducing specific impulse. This is a reduction in the effective exhaust velocity, versus the actual exhaust velocity achieved in vacuum conditions. In the case of gas-generator cycle rocket engines, more than one exhaust gas stream is present as turbopump exhaust gas exits through a separate nozzle. Calculating the effective exhaust velocity requires averaging the two mass flows as well as accounting for any atmospheric pressure.

For air-breathing jet engines, particularly turbofans, the actual exhaust velocity and the effective exhaust velocity are different by orders of magnitude. This happens for several reasons. First, a good deal of additional momentum is obtained by using air as reaction mass, such that combustion products in the exhaust have more mass than the burned fuel. Next, inert gases in the atmosphere absorb heat from combustion, and through the resulting expansion provide additional thrust. Lastly, for turbofans and other designs there is even more thrust created by pushing against intake air which never sees combustion directly. These all combine to allow a better match between the airspeed and the exhaust speed, which saves energy/propellant and enormously increases the effective exhaust velocity while reducing the actual exhaust velocity. Again, this is because the mass of the air is not counted in the specific impulse calculation, thus attributing all of the thrust momentum to the mass of the fuel component of the exhaust, and omitting the reaction mass, inert gas, and effect of driven fans on overall engine efficiency from consideration. 

Essentially, the momentum of engine exhaust includes a lot more than just fuel, but specific impulse calculation ignores everything but the fuel. Even though the effective exhaust velocity for an air-breathing engine seems nonsensical in the context of actual exhaust velocity, this is still useful for comparing absolute fuel efficiency of different engines.

Density specific impulse

While less important than the specific impulse, it is an important measure in launch vehicle design, as a low specific impulse implies that bigger tanks will be required to store the propellant, which in turn will have a detrimental effect on the launch vehicle's mass ratio.

Examples

An air-breathing jet engine typically has a much larger specific impulse than a rocket; for example a turbofan jet engine may have a specific impulse of 6,000 seconds or more at sea level whereas a rocket would be between 200 and 400 seconds.

An air-breathing engine is thus much more propellant efficient than a rocket engine, because the air serves as reaction mass and oxidizer for combustion which does not have to be carried as propellant, and the actual exhaust speed is much lower, so the kinetic energy the exhaust carries away is lower and thus the jet engine uses far less energy to generate thrust. While the actual exhaust velocity is lower for air-breathing engines, the effective exhaust velocity is very high for jet engines. This is because the effective exhaust velocity calculation assumes that the carried propellant is providing all the reaction mass and all the thrust. Hence effective exhaust velocity is not physically meaningful for air-breathing engines; nevertheless, it is useful for comparison with other types of engines.

However, this combination is impractical. Lithium and fluorine are both extremely corrosive, lithium ignites on contact with air, fluorine ignites on contact with most fuels, and hydrogen, while not hypergolic, is an explosive hazard. Fluorine and the hydrogen fluoride (HF) in the exhaust are very toxic, which damages the environment, makes work around the launch pad difficult, and makes getting a launch license that much more difficult. The rocket exhaust is also ionized, which would interfere with radio communication with the rocket.

Nuclear thermal rocket engines differ from conventional rocket engines in that energy is supplied to the propellants by an external nuclear heat source instead of the heat of combustion. The nuclear rocket typically operates by passing liquid hydrogen gas through an operating nuclear reactor. Testing in the 1960s yielded specific impulses of about 850 seconds (8,340 m/s), about twice that of the Space Shuttle engines.

A variety of other rocket propulsion methods, such as ion thrusters, give much higher specific impulse but with much lower thrust; for example the Hall-effect thruster on the SMART-1 satellite has a specific impulse of  but a maximum thrust of only .

See also

 Jet engine
 Impulse
 Tsiolkovsky rocket equation
 System-specific impulse
 Specific energy
 Standard gravity
 Thrust specific fuel consumption—fuel consumption per unit thrust
 Specific thrust—thrust per unit of air for a duct engine
 Heating value
 Energy density
 Delta-v (physics)
 Rocket propellant
 Liquid rocket propellants

Notes

References

External links
RPA - Design Tool for Liquid Rocket Engine Analysis
List of Specific Impulses of various rocket fuels

Rocket propulsion
Spacecraft propulsion
Physical quantities
Classical mechanics
Engine technology